Ny Antsaly is a band that performed traditional vakodrazana music from the central highlands of Madagascar. The band is considered Madagascar's first internationally acclaimed touring musical group.  Ny Antsaly performed for several European sovereigns in the 1960s, and also gave a concert for the Welsh National Eistedfodd in 1962.

See also
Music of Madagascar

Notes

Malagasy musical groups